Maria von Linden (18 July 1869 – 25 August 1936) was a German bacteriologist and zoologist. She was the first woman admitted to study at the University of Tübingen, and became one of the first women in Germany to be given the academic title of “Professor”. She patented a type of bandage and won a prize for her research on butterfly wings. She was driven from office due to the rise of the Nazi Party in Germany.

Early life
Linden was born in 1869 to a German aristocratic family who lived at  near Heidenheim, Kingdom of Württemberg (now Baden-Württemberg). Her parents, Edward and Eugenie von Linden, arranged for her to attend school in Karlsruhe for four years. While at school, Linden developed an interest in maths and physics. She wrote her first paper on mineral deposits in the River Hürbe read at Karlsruhe's geological society in 1890. This paper was noticed by geologist Professor von Quenstedt from the University of Tübingen.

Career

In 1891, after private tutoring and clearance from a minister, she became the first woman in the Kingdom of Württemberg to take (and pass) the "Reifeprüfung" examination. This examination was required to attend a German university. Despite this, she failed to gain admittance to Eberhard Karls University of Tübingen, despite pressure from her uncle, an ex-minister, and Linden was forced to resume tutoring in private. However, the university allowed her to be a guest student, with her studies at the university being financed and supported by the German Association of Female Citizens.

She continued her study of math and physics, writing papers on natural history as she learned about Lamarckian evolution from the zoologist Theodor Eimer. Under Eimer's guidance, she completed her thesis in 1895 on how the evolution of snails led to the development of their shells. She was awarded a doctorate in Natural Science and worked as an assistant to Eimer until he died in 1898.

In 1903 Linden was awarded the Da Gama Machado prize for her research into the development of colour in butterfly wings. In 1908 she moved to Bonn, where she led the new Institute of Parasitology. She researched the causes and symptoms of tuberculosis and other lung diseases. She believed that copper might provide therapy for tuberculosis. While in Bonn, she took Misses von Altenburg as her companion. Linden became the first woman (or one of the first) to be made a titular professor in Germany in 1910, despite the disapproval of the Prussian Ministry of Education. However, despite her rank as a professor, she was not allowed to teach.

Linden received a patent for her discovery that copper salts could be used as a disinfectant. A bandaging company later included copper salts into their products.

Linden sold the family castle, but the Nazification of Germany meant that she was forced to leave her job. She emigrated with Misses von Altenburg to Liechtenstein.

Death and legacy
Linden died of pneumonia on August 25, 1936 in Schaan, Liechtenstein. Her lifelong friend Gabriele von Wartensleben (1870-1953), a female pioneer in psychology, was later buried in the same tomb.

In 1999, a secondary school in Calw was named after her: the Maria-von-Linden-Gymnasium, a science-oriented grammar school.

Also known as
Linden may also be known as:  Maria Countess von Linden; Maria Gräfin von Linden; Maria Gräfin von Linden-Aspermont; Maria von Linden-Aspermont; or Linden-Aspermont.

References

1869 births
1936 deaths
German bacteriologists
German women scientists
Deaths from pneumonia in Liechtenstein